Mixed martial arts (MMA) is a full-contact combat sport.

MMA may also refer to:

Places
 Maastricht Formation (MMa), a geologic formation in Belgium and the Netherlands

Business and commerce
 MacRobertson Miller Airlines, Western Australia, 1934-1980s
 Maldives Monetary Authority, a central bank
 Malta Maritime Authority
 Manufacturer's Mutual Association, later Association of Licensed Automobile Manufacturers
 Money market account, a type of bank account
 Former Montreal, Maine and Atlantic Railway, reporting mark
 Music Modernization Act, 2018, US law
 Myanmar Music Association
 Melon Music Awards
 Union of Sales and Marketing Professionals, a Finnish trade union

Medicine
 Mammalian Meat Allergy or alpha-gal allergy
 Methenmadinone acetate, a progestin
 Maxillomandibular advancement, a jaw surgical procedure
 Methylmalonic acidemia, an autosomal genetic disorder
 Methylmalonic acid
 Middle meningeal artery
 Monomelic amyotrophy, a motor neuron disease

Museums
 Maria Mitchell Association, Nantucket, Massachusetts, US

Politics and religion
 Metropolitan Manila Authority, predecessor of the Metropolitan Manila Development Authority (MMDA), a Philippine government agency
 Medicare Modernization Act, a US law
 Muttahida Majlis-e-Amal, a political alliance, Pakistan

Science and technology
 Manual metal arc welding
 Methyl methacrylate, an organic compound
 Methylmalonic acid, a dicarboxylic acid
 MIDI Manufacturers Association
 Millimeter Array, an American radio telescope project
 Monomethylaniline, an aniline derivative
 Multimission Maritime Aircraft or P-8 Poseidon, US Navy program
 Tecnam MMA, a variant of the Tecnam P2006T aircraft
 3-Methoxy-4-methylamphetamine, a psychedelic drug

Schools
 Maine Maritime Academy, a public college in Castine, Maine
 Massachusetts Maritime Academy, a public college in Buzzards Bay, Massachusetts
 Massanutten Military Academy, a college-prep, military school in Woodstock, VA
 Maximo Mirafuentes Academy, a private high school in Tagum, Davao del Norte, Philippines
 Milford Mill Academy, a public high school in Baltimore County, Maryland
 Military Medical Academy, a teaching hospital in Sofia, Bulgaria
 Missouri Military Academy, a boarding school Mexico, Missouri, US

Music 

 Melon Music Awards, an awards ceremony in South Korea

Military 
 Military Manpower Administration, a Conscription agency in South Korea

See also

 
 MMAS (disambiguation)
 MA (disambiguation)
 mam (disambiguation)
 AMM (disambiguation)
 MAA (disambiguation)